Zlatan Saračević (born 27 July 1956) is a retired Bosnian shot putter who represented SFR Yugoslavia and Bosnia and Herzegovina.

Biography
He was born in Zenica, SR Bosnia and Herzegovina. but represented the clubs AK Sloboda Tuzla, AK Slavonija Osijek, AK Mladost Zagreb, AK Crvena Zvezda and  AK Zmaj od Bosne Tuzla. He won the gold medal at the 1980 European Indoor Championships, the bronze medal at the 1981 European Indoor Championships, and  the silver medal at the 1983 Summer Universiade. He also competed at the 1992 Olympic Games and the 1996 European Indoor Championships without reaching the final.

His personal best throw was 21.11 metres, achieved in June 1984 in Zagreb.

He also represented Bosnia and Herzegovina at the 1992 Summer Olympics and was the country's first ever flag bearer.

References

1956 births
Living people
Sportspeople from Zenica
Bosnia and Herzegovina male shot putters
Yugoslav male shot putters
Olympic athletes of Bosnia and Herzegovina
Athletes (track and field) at the 1992 Summer Olympics
Universiade medalists in athletics (track and field)
Universiade silver medalists for Yugoslavia
Medalists at the 1983 Summer Universiade